Hewlett Packard Enterprise El Capitan, is an upcoming exascale supercomputer, hosted at the Lawrence Livermore National Laboratory in Livermore, United States and projected to become operational in 2023. It is based on the Cray EX Shasta architecture. When deployed, El Capitan is projected to displace Frontier as the world's fastest supercomputer.

Design 
El Capitan has been announced to use an unknown number of AMD Instinct MI300 CPUs.  The MI300 consists of 24 AMD Zen AMD64-based CPU cores, and CDNA 3-based GPU integrated onto a single organic package, along with 128GB of HBMe RAM.

The floor space and number of racks for El Capitan have not yet been announced.

Blades are interconnected by HPE Slingshot 64-port switch that provides 12.8 terabits/second of bandwidth. Groups of blades are linked in a dragonfly topology with at most three hops between any two nodes. Cabling is either optical or copper, customized to minimize cable length. Total cabling runs .

El Capitan has coherent interconnects between CPUs and GPUs, allowing GPU memory to be accessed coherently by code running on the Epyc CPUs.

History 
El Capitan was ordered as a part of the Department of Energy's CORAL-2 initiative, intended to replace Sierra (supercomputer), an IBM/NVIDIA machine deployed in 2018.  LLNL partnered with HPE Cray and AMD to build the system.

References 

Cray products
Exascale computers
GPGPU supercomputers
Lawrence Livermore National Laboratory
X86 supercomputers
64-bit computers